Michael is one of the six sheadings of the Isle of Man. It is located on the west of the island (part of the traditional North Side division) and consists of the three historic parishes of Ballaugh, Jurby and Michael.

Historic parish
Michael is one of the seventeen historic parishes of the Isle of Man.

It is located on the west of the island (part of the traditional North Side division) in the sheading of Michael.

Other settlements in the parish include Barregarrow.

Local government
For the purposes of local government, the whole of the historic parish forms a single district with Commissioners.

The district of Michael was formed in 1989 by the re-amalgamation of two local authority areas, Michael village and the larger rural area of Michael parish. These two local authority areas had been separated from one another in 1905.

The Captain of the Parish (since 1970) is John James Martin Cannell.

Politics
Michael parish is part of the Ayre & Michael constituency, which elects two Members to the House of Keys. Before 2016 it was in the Michael constituency.

Geography
Michael Parish has, according to the 2016 census, 1,591 residents, down from 1,729 in 2011. It is a mainly agricultural area on the west coast of the island. It was until 2016 a House of Keys constituency. The only significant settlement in the parish or district is the village of Kirk Michael.

The TT motorcycle race course known as the Snaefell Mountain Course runs through Kirk Michael village.

Michael District stretches from the Irish Sea in the west, inland to Druidale in the east and from Orrisdale in the north to Glen Cam in the south. 
The district contains few settlements; the main village is Kirk Michael. There is a coastal strip, about 3 km wide, of agricultural land, and the remainder of the parish consists of moorland, of which the highest points are Slieau Freoaghane, Sartfell, Slieau Curn and Slieau Dhoo (together known as the Michael Hills).

The main road running through Kirk Michael village forms part of the Isle of Man TT road race course, on the A3 leading towards Ballaugh Bridge.

Kirk Michael is served by buses between Peel and Ramsey (and also between Douglas and Ramsey via Ballacraine). It is on the course of the former Manx Northern Railway.

The village
The name of the village is derived from "Kirk" ("Church") of Michael. The parish church of St Michael in the village contains a large collection of Manx Norse crosses. 
The village is served by several small local shops, a primary school and a public house. 
The Mitre Hotel, the local public house is named in connection with Bishop's Court and was once patronised by Fletcher Christian (Mutiny on the Bounty). "Christian" is a popular Manx surname. On the same plot of land as the Mitre Hotel stands the Ecclesiastical Courthouse. First built in 1766, at the request of Bishop Wilson, and then later rebuilt in 1835, it was the last working rural courthouse on the Isle of Man. 
Infrequent bus services run to the towns of Ramsey, Peel and Douglas.

Other places of interest
Local areas of interest include:

Glen Wyllin village and Glen Wyllin itself (the Glen was once the site of a trout farm but the farm was lost due to coastal erosion). Glen Wyllin now has a seasonal camp site.
Cooildarry Nature Reserve (in the upper part of Glen Wyllin).
Bishop's Court, the former residence of the Bishop of Sodor and Man but now a private residence, is located about 2 km north of Kirk Michael village, on the boundary with Ballaugh. The grounds and chapel of Bishop's Court are opened to the public occasionally. Bishop's Court Glen, on the other side of the TT course, and shared with Ballaugh, was once the private garden of the Bishop. The glen includes an artificial mound called Mount Aeolus, which resembles Tynwald Hill, and The Cave of the Winds. Until 1987 the mound had two cannon on top. The mound was built under Bishop Mark Hildesley to commemorate the victory of Captain Elliot over the French privateer François Thurot off the coast near Ramsey in 1760.
Cronk Urleigh is a small hillock near Kirk Michael which until 1428 was the site of the Tynwald Courts.

MHKs & Elections
The following information is incomplete.

The constituency was abolished in 2016.

In literature
Most of the action of The Deemster takes place in Michael Sheading.

In film 
Glen Wyllin (Glen Mooar) beach was used as a location in the 2004 film Five Children and It.

See also
Local government in the Isle of Man

References

External links
Isle of Man Building Control Districts showing parish boundaries
Glenology - Manx Glens. An ongoing study of Manx glens, their locations and meanings.
A Manx Notebook
IOM Guide: Kirk Michael
IOM Guide: Bishop's Court
Multimap of the area
Manx National Heritage
Isle of Man Census 2006 PDF
Constituency maps and general election results

Sheadings of the Isle of Man
Constituencies of the Isle of Man
Parishes of the Isle of Man